Budzyń may refer to the following places:
Budzyń, Łódź Voivodeship (central Poland)
Budzyń, Biłgoraj County in Lublin Voivodeship (east Poland)
Budzyń, Opole Lubelskie County in Lublin Voivodeship (east Poland)
Budzyń, Kraków County in Lesser Poland Voivodeship (south Poland)
Budzyń, Olkusz County in Lesser Poland Voivodeship (south Poland)
Budzyń, Świętokrzyskie Voivodeship (south-central Poland)
Budzyń, Subcarpathian Voivodeship (south-east Poland)
Budzyń, Greater Poland Voivodeship (west-central Poland)
, a district of Kraśnik in Lublin Voivodeship
 , Kraśnik, Nazi-operated 1942-1944